Taylan is a male Turkish given name. In Turkish, "Taylan" means "elegant", "kind", "gracious", "herocious" and/or "tall and skinny person".

Given name
 Taylan Aydoğan (born 1983), Turkish-German footballer

Surname
 Ahmet Mümtaz Taylan (born 1965), Turkish film, television and theater actor and director
 Justin Taylan (born 1977), American author and historian 
 Muhittin Taylan (1910–1983), Turkish judge
 Nurcan Taylan (born 1983), Turkish female Olympic, world and European champion weightlifter
 The Taylan Brothers, Durul Taylan (born 1969) and Yağmur Taylan (born 1966), Turkish film directors

Places
 Taylan, a village in Kyrgyzstan

Turkish-language surnames
Turkish masculine given names